Ardisia martinensis is a species of plant in the family Primulaceae. It is endemic to Peru.

References

martinensis
Endemic flora of Peru
Vulnerable flora of South America
Taxonomy articles created by Polbot